Derek James Parlane (born 5 May 1953) is a Scottish former professional football striker who played for Rangers from 1970 until 1980, and also played in England with clubs including Leeds United and Manchester City.

Career

Rangers and Leeds United
Raised in the small village of Rhu, Parlane joined Rangers as a teenager, from Queens Park following in the footsteps of his father Jimmy who had a spell with the club in the 1940s. He made 300 appearances winning three Scottish League championships, three Scottish Cups, three Scottish League Cups and the 1971–72 European Cup Winners' Cup; he was capped by Scotland 12 times (with one Under-21 cap). Furthermore, Parlane was inducted into the Rangers Hall of Fame in 2010.

He moved to Leeds United in March 1980 for a fee of £160,000. He scored 10 goals in 53 appearances for Leeds before going to Hong Kong on loan to Bulova.

Manchester City and later career
Aged 30, on 14 July 1983, new Manchester City manager Billy McNeill brought Parlane to Maine Road on a free transfer He linked up with another newcomer, fellow Scot Jim Tolmie, and both made their debut for the Blues on Saturday 27 August 1983 in a 2-1 win against Crystal Palace at Selhurst Park in the Second Division. Parlane and Tolmie each scored one which set a precedent for the rest of the season. In all, Parlane scored 20 goals in 48 appearances for City.

For 1984–85 season did City signed David Phillips from Coventry City and Tony Cunningham from Newcastle United to bolster their attack. Parlane got injured in September 1984 and was sold to Swansea City in January 1985.

He spent the 1985–86 season in Belgium with Racing Jet, before returning to play two seasons with Rochdale from 1986 to 1988, playing 42 games and scoring 10 times. His last professional club was Airdrie in the 1987–88 season, he scored 4 goals in 9 games, before signing for then non-league outfit Macclesfield Town in England.

References

External links

Scottish footballers
Scottish expatriate footballers
Scotland international footballers
Rangers F.C. players
Leeds United F.C. players
Manchester City F.C. players
Swansea City A.F.C. players
Bulova SA players
Rochdale A.F.C. players
Airdrieonians F.C. (1878) players
Macclesfield Town F.C. players
Racing Jet Wavre players
Challenger Pro League players
Hong Kong First Division League players
1953 births
Living people
Association football forwards
Scottish Football League players
Scottish Football League representative players
English Football League players
People from Helensburgh
Scotland under-21 international footballers
Scotland under-23 international footballers
Expatriate footballers in Hong Kong
Expatriate footballers in Belgium
Scottish expatriate sportspeople in Belgium
Scottish expatriate sportspeople in Hong Kong
Sportspeople from Argyll and Bute
People educated at Hermitage Academy
Queen's Park F.C. players
Curzon Ashton F.C. players